Maria Fragoudaki (b. 1983, Greece), is a New York-based contemporary, interdisciplinary artist who draws on a variety of media and practices, such as painting, sculpture, dance and performance.

Work 
Maria Fragoudaki has presented her work in numerous group and solo shows at venues throughout Europe, the US and Japan, including The Royal Academy of Arts in London, the Jewish Museum of Greece, Scope Miami, Scope Basel, the Historical and Folklore Museum of Aegina in Greece and the Goulandris Natural History Museum in Athens

In April 2017, Maria Fragoudaki staged a performance titled ‘BedSheets: The Duality of Freedom,’ at Athens's Syntagma Square.

References 

Greek expatriates in the United States
21st-century American women artists
21st-century American painters
21st-century American sculptors
American women painters
American women performance artists
American women sculptors
American performance artists
Sculptors from New York (state)
Painters from New York City
1983 births
Living people